DignityUSA is an organization with headquarters in Boston, Massachusetts, that focuses on LGBT rights and the Catholic Church. Dignity Canada exists as the Canadian sister organization. The organization is made up of local chapters across the country, and functions both as a support and social group for LGBT and LGBT-accepting Catholics to worship together. "The goal of 'Dignity' is to serve as an advocate for change in the Roman Catholic Church's stance on homosexuality", and as an activist group for LGBT rights and education about LGBT issues.

Since 2007, Marianne Duddy-Burke has served as executive director.

History
Dignity was founded in early 1969 in San Diego, California, by Father Pat Nidorf, first as a counseling group, then as a support group. That makes it a "pre-Stonewall" LGBT organization that is still in existence. The first chapter of Dignity formed in 1970 in Los Angeles. 

In 1982, lesbian members of Dignity founded the Conference for Catholic Lesbians, out of concern that Dignity was too oriented toward males.

DignityUSA has been recognized by the US Internal Revenue Service as a 501(c)(3) nonprofit organization since August 1982.

On the Pastoral Care of Homosexual Persons

On October 1, 1986, the Congregation for the Doctrine of the Faith, the Catholic body charged to "spread sound Catholic doctrine and defend those points of Christian tradition which seem in danger because of new and unacceptable doctrines", issued a letter entitled On the Pastoral Care of Homosexual Persons. In it, the Catholic Church affirmed its position that homosexual activity was "objectively disordered" and that all support should be withdrawn from any organization that undermined the Church's teaching or were ambiguous about or neglectful of it.

According to writer Neil Miller, an immediate effect of the document was the decision by several American bishops to order that DignityUSA no longer be allowed to hold Mass in Catholic churches. Dioceses in Atlanta, Minneapolis, Buffalo, Brooklyn, Pensacola, Vancouver, Washington, D.C., and New York City all rescinded permission for the organization to hold services on church property. In some cases the group chapters had been holding Masses for a decade or longer.

Honors
DignityUSA was given Call To Action's 1994 Leadership Award. 

Dignity Chicago was inducted into the Chicago Gay and Lesbian Hall of Fame in 1997.

In 2023, San Francisco Mayor London Breed declared January 15 Dignity/San Francisco Day and issued a proclamation; 2023 was the year of Dignity/San Francisco’s fiftieth anniversary.

Chapters
As of 2021, there are 37 chapters, in the United States. During the COVID-19 pandemic, there were currently 17 offering online services.

See also

Catholics United
Homosexuality and Catholicism
Integrity USA, Anglican Communion
LGBT-welcoming church programs
Ministry to Persons with a Homosexual Inclination
New Ways Ministry
On the Pastoral Care of Homosexual Persons

Notes

References
 Hogan, Steve and Lee Hudson (1998). Completely Queer: The Gay and Lesbian Encyclopedia. New York, Henry Holt and Company. .
 Miller, Neil (1995). Out Of the Past: Gay and Lesbian History From 1869 To the Present. New York, Vintage (a division of Random House). .
 The National Museum & Archive of Lesbian and Gay History (1996). The Gay Almanac. New York, Berkeley Books. .

External links 
 
 Conference for Catholic Lesbians

LGBT and Catholicism
LGBT churches in the United States
LGBT Christian organizations
Organizations established in 1969
1969 establishments in California
501(c)(3) organizations
Organizations based in Massachusetts
Medford, Massachusetts